The 2017–18 SV Meppen season is the 106th season in the football club's history and 1st season in the 3. Liga, the third tier of German football, having been promoted from the Regionalliga Nord in 2017. In addition to the domestic league, SV Meppen also participated in this season's edition of the Lower Saxony Cup, the regional cup for teams in Lower Saxony. Meppen play their matches at the Hänsch-Arena, located in Meppen, Emsland, Lower Saxony, Germany. The season covers a period from 1 July 2017 to 30 June 2018.

Players

Squad information

The club played eleven consecutive seasons in the 2. Bundesliga from 1988 to 1998. In 404 games there, the team scored 495 goals, with a record of 124 wins, 139 draws, and 141 losses.

Competitions

Overview

3. Liga

League table

Results summary

Results by round

Matches

Lower Saxony Cup

References

SV Meppen seasons
Meppen